Uruguay competed at the 1964 Summer Olympics in Tokyo, Japan. 23 competitors, all men, took part in 8 events in 4 sports.

Medalists

Bronze
 Washington Rodriguez — Boxing, Men's Bantamweight (54 kg)

Basketball

Jorge Maya Dodera
Manuel Gadea
Luis García
Luis Koster
Ramiro de León
Walter Márquez
Edison Ciavattone
Washington Poyet
Sergio Pisano
Alvaro Roca
Waldemar Rial
Julio Gómez

Boxing

Washington Rodríguez

Cycling

Eight cyclists represented Uruguay in 1964.

 Individual road race
 Ricardo Vázquez
 Francisco Pérez
 Vid Cencic
 Wilde Baridón

 Team time trial
 Wilde Baridón
 Vid Cencic
 Francisco Pérez
 Ricardo Vázquez

 1000m time trial
 Oscar Almada

 Individual pursuit
 Rubén Etchebarne

 Team pursuit
 Oscar Almada
 Rubén Etchebarne
 Elio Juárez
 Juan José Timón

Rowing

Mariano Caulín
Gustavo Pérez

References

External links
Montevideo.com
Official Olympic Reports
International Olympic Committee results database

Nations at the 1964 Summer Olympics
1964
1964 in Uruguayan sport